The California Institute for Telecommunications and Information Technology (Calit2, previously Cal(IT)2), also referred to as the Qualcomm Institute (QI) at its San Diego branch, is a $400 million academic research institution jointly run by the University of California San Diego (UCSD) and the University of California, Irvine (UCI); in January 2022, plans were announced to add University of California, Riverside to the consortium. Calit2 was established in 2000 as one of the four UC Gray Davis Institutes for Science and Innovation.  As a  multidisciplinary research institution, it is conducting research discovering new ways in which emerging technologies can improve the state's economy and citizens' quality of life. Keeping in mind its goal of addressing large-scale societal issues, Calit2 extends beyond education and research by also focusing on the development and deployment of prototype infrastructure for testing new solutions in real world environments. Calit2 also provides an academic research environment in which students can work alongside industry professionals to take part in conducting research and prototyping and testing new technologies.

Since 2008, Calit2 has implemented its strategic plan, Path Forward. The plan is based on the four core enabling technologies of wireless telecommunications, photonics, nanotechnology and micro-electro-mechanicals systems (MEMS), and cyber space in order to digitally transform applications in culture, health, energy, and the environment. Partnering with companies such as Broadcom, Cisco Systems, Hitachi, and Google Earth, Calit2 has collaborated with more than 250 industry names on sponsored research, technology licensing, and spinoffs based on Calit2 inventions. The State of California provided a $100 million grant to Calit2 to support the design and construction of both campus buildings and facilities. Calit2 also receives support from other funding agencies such as the National Science Foundation, National Institutes of Health, CalTrans, and the UC Discovery Program.

Research
Calit2 conducts notable research projects in the following areas: 
Digitally Enabled Genomic Medicine
Education
Environment & Civil Infrastructure
Intelligent Transportation
Interfaces & Software
Materials & Devices
Network Infrastructure
New Media Arts
Policy & Society

One notable project is Project GreenLight, in which research was dedicated in finding a way to build a functional green compute facility. Calit2 is also known for its project, Community Cyberinfrastructure for Advanced Marine Microbial Ecology Research and Analysis (CAMERA), which was created to address the challenges the microbial ecology research community faced in metagenomic analysis. Currently, CAMERA aims to create a rich, distinctive data repository and bioinformatics tools to support the growing amount of data on metagenomic data.

Gallery QI
Gallery QI (formerly gallery@calit2), located on first floor of Atkinson Hall on the UC San Diego campus, is led by an interdisciplinary committee of UC San Diego faculty. The Gallery has presented numerous exhibitions from artists around the world, including Jordan Crandall, Carlos Trilnick, Felipe Zuñiga, Nina Waisman, Ignacio Lopez, Adriene Jenik, Antoinette LaFarge, Robert Allen, Greg Niemeyer and Sabrina Raaf. Guest curators have included Christiane Paul and Steve Dietz.

The Gallery has hosted talks by artists including Ann Hamilton, Jordan Crandall, Micha Cárdenas, Amy Sara Carroll, Sharon Daniel, Warren Sack and Rita Raley.

People
Calit2 is home to scientific, artistic, and technological innovators, with faculty members often sharing affiliations with other academic departments, including Engineering, Music and Medicine. Roughly 600 participating faculty collaborate on projects, research centers and ‘living laboratories’ across the consortium.

Leadership is divided into four main groups: Directors, Divisional Councils, Governing Board, and the advisory board. Notable and distinguished members of the advisory board include: 
Anne Petersen, co-chair (Research Professor, University of Michigan, Center for Human Growth and Development, Founder and President, Global Philanthropy Alliance)
Drew Senyei, M.D., co-chair (managing director, Enterprise Partners)
Mark Anderson (Chief Executive Officer, Strategic News Service)
Greg Brandeau (former CTO, Walt Disney Studios)
Vint Cerf (Vice President and Chief Internet Evangelist, Google)
Martha Dennis (Independent Board Member)
Raouf Y. Halim (Chief Executive Officer, Mindspeed Technologies, Inc.)
Linda A. Hill (Professor, Harvard Business School)
Jessie J. Knight, Jr. (former Chairman, San Diego Gas & Electric)
Roberto Padovani (former CTO, Qualcomm)
Peter G. Preuss (Chair, UC San Diego Foundation Board of Trustees)
Stanton Rowe (Corporate Vice President for Advanced Technology, Edwards Lifesciences)
David Schramm (former Chief Executive Officer, Maxwell Technologies)
Andrew Viterbi (President, The Viterbi Group, Professor Emeritus, University of California San Diego)
Julie Meier Wright (Senior Fellow, U.S. Council on Competitiveness)

Buildings
Calit2 currently has two buildings, one located at UC San Diego, and another at UC Irvine. The two Calit2 facilities have unique capabilities such as clean rooms, MEMS labs, immersive virtual reality facilities, and a digital cinema theater. Another important feature of these buildings is its shared laboratory space that is both flexible and reconfigurable as the space can be reassigned or rearranged when new projects emerge.

UCSD Building

The full name of the UCSD division of Calit2 is the "Qualcomm Institute for Telecommunications and Information Technology, the UC San Diego Division of Calit2". Atkinson Hall is the home of the Qualcomm Institute. The 215,000-square-foot facility was designed by NBBJ and constructed by Gilbane and is "inspired by the notion of change and the coexistence of opposites". This building was designed as an instrument of research to encourage partners to combine in unusual teams to make fundamental discoveries. Atkinson Hall's interior encourages open communication and collaboration between colleagues through its open and reconfigurable design. This building features the futuristic StarCAVE virtual reality (VR) environment. The StarCAVE is a pentagonal, three-dimensional VR room where the audience and viewer are surrounded by 360-degree projections over 15 screens covering the walls and two screens on the floor. Another important feature Atkinson Hall provides to its visitors and researchers is its extreme bandwidth. Atkinson Hall contains about 2 million feet of category 6 copper cabling with 150 optical fibers connecting the building to UCSD's network.

UCI Building

The Calit2 building at the University of California, Irvine is currently a 120,000-square-foot building designed by Johnson Fain Partners and constructed by PCL Construction Services. Aside from its research labs, offices, support space, meeting space, and four-story atrium, the Calit2 building at UCI also houses a 3,700 square-foot Nanofabrication Cleanroom Facility. This room offers a filtered-air environment, large-scale visualization lab, network lab, and also labs for optical devices, nanotechnology and media arts. The Calit2 building features a spacious and state-of-the-art auditorium that can seat an audience of around 145 people. The UCI facility also has access to UCI's first Voice-over-IP phone system and statewide/nationwide high-speed fiber optic networks. The UCI Calit2 building is  the home of TechPortal, a business technology incubator offering 1460 square feet of space for up to eight companies. TechPortal provides affordable space, access to facilities/services, and expert mentoring to UCI-based startup companies. Also, with the help of the U.S. Geological Survey, this building also contains 40 seismic sensors that measure ground and building motion.

Awards
Since 2009, Calit2 has been awarded several funded research grants by National Institutes of Health and National Science Foundation. Along with research grants, Calit2 was honored the Innovations in Networking Award for High-Performance Research Applications by the Corporation for Education Network Initiatives in California (CENIC) from 2007 to 2012. This annual award is given out annually to "highlight exemplary innovations that leverage ultra high-bandwidth networking, particularly where those innovations have the potential to revolutionize the ways in which instruction and research are conducted, or where they further the deployment of broadband in underserved areas." Calit2's most recent project honored by CENIC was its Mexican-American advanced network project to increase bandwidth and network communication between research facilities in Mexico and America. The other past projects recognized by CENIC have included the CineGrid consortium, the Scalable, Energy Efficient Datacenters (SEED) project, and the GreenLight project.

See also
 MIT Media Lab - A similar entity on the East Coast

References

University of California, San Diego
University of California, Irvine
Governor Gray Davis Institutes for Science and Innovation
Research institutes in California
Research institutes established in 2005
2005 establishments in California
University of California, Irvine main campus buildings and structures
Telecommunication education
Computer science institutes in the United States